Nathan Bozeman (March 25, 1825 — February 16, 1905), was a physician and early gynecologist, first in Montgomery, Alabama, and then in New York City. He studied medicine at the University of Louisville, graduating in 1848.

He was collaborator of and then critic of controversial physician J. Marion Sims, whose practice and home in Montgomery he purchased in 1853, when Dr. Sims had to leave Alabama because of his health. Bozeman succeeded Sims as surgeon of the New York Woman's Hospital.

During the Civil War, he was for four years a surgeon in the Confederate Army.

References

1825 births
1905 deaths
American gynecologists
19th-century American physicians
Physicians from Alabama
People of Alabama in the American Civil War
Physicians from New York City
Confederate States Army surgeons